Copy Cursor, Copy-Cursor or CopyCursor may refer to:

Copy Cursor (Acorn), a feature in Acorn MOS since 1981 and RISC OS since 1987
Copy Cursor (CPC), a feature in the Amstrad CPC series since 1984
Copy Cursor (K3PLUS), a feature in the extended DOS keyboard driver K3PLUS since 1991
Copy Cursor (FreeKEYB), a feature in the advanced DOS keyboard and console driver FreeKEYB since 1996